A gubernatorial election was held on 7 April 2019 as part of the 19th unified elections to elect the next governor of Nara Prefecture, Japan.

Candidates 
Shōgo Arai, backed by the local LDP, Komeito, DPFP.
Kiyoshige Maekawa, ex member of DPJ and Kibō no Tō.
Minoru Kawashima.

Results

References 

Gubernatorial elections in Japan
2019 elections in Japan
April 2019 events in Japan
Politics of Nara Prefecture